August 15 - Eastern Orthodox liturgical calendar - August 17

All fixed commemorations below are observed on August 29 by Orthodox Churches on the Old Calendar.

For August 16, Orthodox Churches on the Old Calendar commemorate the Saints listed on August 3.

Feasts

 Afterfeast of the Dormition.
 ''Translation of the "Image not made by hands" (Acheiropoieta) of Jesus Christ from Edessa to Constantinople (944)

Saints

 Martyr Diomedes the Physician, of Tarsus in Cilicia (298)
 Martyr Alcibiades, by fire.
 33 Martyrs of Palestine, by the sword.
 Venerable Chaeremon of Egypt (4th century)
 Saint Anthony the Stylite, of Martqopi, Georgia (6th century)
 Saint Makarios the Archbishop.

Pre-Schism Western saints

 Saint Ambrose, a centurion put to death under Diocletian, in Ferentino, central Italy (c. 303)
 Saint Titus, a Deacon martyred during the sack of Rome by the Goths, while distributing alms to the half-starved population (c. 410)
 Saint Armagillus (Armel), founder of Saint-Armel-des-Boscheaux and Plou-Ermel (Ploermel) in Brittany (c. 550)
 Saint Eleutherius of Auxerre, Bishop of Auxerre from 532–561, who assisted at the Second, Third, Fourth and Fifth Councils of Orléans between 533 and 549 (561)
 Saint Simplician, a friend and advisor of St Ambrose, whom he succeeded as Bishop of Milan (400)
 Saint Stephen of Hungary, King of Hungary (1038)  (see also: August 20 - East)

Post-Schism Orthodox saints

 Saint Joachim, monk, of Osogovo and Sarandapor, Bulgarian monk (1105)
 Saint Eustathius II, archbishop of Serbia (1309)
 Venerable Nilus of Ereikoussa, nephew of Emperor Theodore Laskaris (c. 1335)
 Saint Romanus the Sinaite, of Djunisa, Serbia (14th century)
 Monk-martyr Christopher of Guria, Georgia, at Damascus (15th century)
 Saint Akakios, Bishop of Liti and Rendini (15th century) 
 Venerable Diodorus, Abbot of Yuriev Monastery, Solovki (1633)
 Venerable New Monk-Martyr Nicodemus of Meteora (1551)
 Venerable Daniel of Meteora.
 Venerable Gerasimus of Kefalonia, the New Ascetic of Cephalonia (1579)
 Saint Raphael of Banat in Serbia (c. 1590)
 Venerable Timothy of Euripos (Timothy of Chalcedon), Archbishop, founder of the Pendeli Monastery (1590)
 New Martyr Stamatius of Demetrias, near Volos, at Constantinople (1680)
 New Great-martyr Apostolos of the town of St. Laurence, martyred at Constantinople (1686)
 New Martyrs King Constantin Brâncoveanu of Wallachia, his four sons Constantine, Stephen, Radu, Matthew, and his counsellor Ioannicius (1714)  ( see also: May 21)
 Saint Joseph of Văratec Monastery, Romania (1828)

New martyrs and confessors

 New Hieromartyr Stephen, Priest (1918)
 New Hieromartyrs priest Vladimir, and his brother Boris (1931)
 New Hieromartyr Alexander Sokolov, Priest, Virgin Martyr Anna Yezhov, and Martyr Jacob Gortinsky (1937)
 Venerable Elder Joseph the Hesychast, of New Skete, Mt. Athos (1959)

Other commemorations

 Translation of the relics (1798) of Martyrs Seraphim, Dorotheus, Jacob (James), Demetrius, Basil, and Sarantis, of Megara.
 Repose of Matrona (Popova), in monasticism Maria (1851), disciple of St. Tikhon of Zadonsk.

Icons

 Icon of the Most Holy Theotokos of Saint Theodore ("Feodorovskaya") of Kostroma (1239)
 Icon of the Theotokos of Port Arthur (1904)

Icon gallery

Notes

References

Sources
 August 16 / August 29. Orthodox Calendar (PRAVOSLAVIE.RU).
 August 29 / August 16. Holy Trinity Russian Orthodox Church (A parish of the Patriarchate of Moscow).
 August 16. OCA - The Lives of the Saints.
 The Autonomous Orthodox Metropolia of Western Europe and the Americas (ROCOR). St. Hilarion Calendar of Saints for the year of our Lord 2004. St. Hilarion Press (Austin, TX). p. 60.
 Menologion: The Sixteenth Day Day of the Month of August. Orthodoxy in China.
 August 16. Latin Saints of the Orthodox Patriarchate of Rome.
 The Roman Martyrology. Transl. by the Archbishop of Baltimore. Last Edition, According to the Copy Printed at Rome in 1914. Revised Edition, with the Imprimatur of His Eminence Cardinal Gibbons. Baltimore: John Murphy Company, 1916. pp. 245-246.
 Rev. Richard Stanton. A Menology of England and Wales, or, Brief Memorials of the Ancient British and English Saints Arranged According to the Calendar, Together with the Martyrs of the 16th and 17th Centuries. London: Burns & Oates, 1892. pp. 395-396.

 Greek Sources
 Great Synaxaristes:  16 ΑΥΓΟΥΣΤΟΥ. ΜΕΓΑΣ ΣΥΝΑΞΑΡΙΣΤΗΣ.
  Συναξαριστής. 16 Αυγούστου. ECCLESIA.GR. (H ΕΚΚΛΗΣΙΑ ΤΗΣ ΕΛΛΑΔΟΣ).

 Russian Sources
  29 августа (16 августа). Православная Энциклопедия под редакцией Патриарха Московского и всея Руси Кирилла (электронная версия). (Orthodox Encyclopedia - Pravenc.ru).

August in the Eastern Orthodox calendar